Federal Highway 259 (Carretera Federal 259) is a Federal Highway of Mexico.

References

259